Henry Knox (1750–1806) was a Continental Army general in the American Revolutionary War. General Knox may also refer to:

Alfred Knox (1870–1964), British Army major general
Charles Edmond Knox (1846–1938), British Army lieutenant general
Harry Knox (1873–1971), British Army general
Jean Knox (1908–1993), Auxiliary Territorial Service major general
William Knox (British Army officer) (1847–1916), British Army lieutenant general

See also
Attorney General Knox (disambiguation)